McAuley Catholic High School is a private, parochial school in Joplin, Missouri.  It is located in the Roman Catholic Diocese of Springfield-Cape Girardeau. It is a regional high school serving Joplin and the surrounding communities. McAuley is a 4 year high school with an enrollment of approximately 70 students.  It is accredited by the Missouri Association for Accreditation of Non-Public Schools.

Background
McAuley Catholic High School was established in 1885.
The school has celebrated over 135 years of Catholic education in the Joplin area.

Recent Changes
The school was forced to convert their nearby storage building into the replacement elementary school over the summer of 2011 as the original was destroyed in a tornado on May 22, 2011. As of 2016 the building is now used for St. Peter's Middle School as St. Mary's Elementary school has built a new building at 3025 S Central City Rd, Joplin, MO 64804.

Due to limited space in the temporary elementary building, McAuley lets the middle school use their facilities for PE, lunch, and art classes.

Notable alumni
Ron Richard (1965) Speaker of the Missouri House of Representatives
C. W. Moss (2006) Author and illustrator of "Unicorn Being a Jerk"

References

External links
 
 

Roman Catholic Diocese of Springfield–Cape Girardeau
Catholic secondary schools in Missouri
Education in Joplin, Missouri
Buildings and structures in Joplin, Missouri
Educational institutions established in 1885
Schools in Jasper County, Missouri
1885 establishments in Missouri